Cristian Iulian Onțel (born 5 April 1998 in Bucharest) is a Romanian professional footballer who plays as a midfielder for Metalul Buzău. He made his debut in Liga I in October 2015, in a game against CSMS Iași.

Career statistics

Club

Statistics accurate as of match played 1 June 2017

Honours

Club

Steaua București 
League Cup: 2015–16

Afumați 
Liga III: 2021–22

References

External links
 
 

1998 births
Living people
Footballers from Bucharest
Romanian footballers
Association football midfielders
Association football forwards
Liga I players
Liga II players
Liga III players
FC Steaua București players
LPS HD Clinceni players
AFC Turris-Oltul Turnu Măgurele players
CS Național Sebiș players
CS Minaur Baia Mare (football) players
CS Afumați players